Pumpelly is a surname. Notable people with the surname include:

People 
Raphael Pumpelly (1837–1923), American geologist and explorer
Spencer Pumpelly (born 1974), American race car driver
Augustus N. Gage, plaintiff in

Places 
Pumpelly Pillar, in Glacier National Park in the U.S. state of Montana
Pumpelly Glacier, in Glacier National Park in the U.S. state of Montana
Pumpelly Studio, house on the former summer estate of geologist Raphael Pumpelly